Kronprinsessegade 28 is a listed, Neoclassical property overlooking Rosenborg Castle Garden in central Copenhagen, Denmark.

History
Kronprinsessegade 28 was built by city builder Jørgen Henrich Rawert in 1805–1806. Rawert was a resident in the building in 1808. The naval officer Poul de Løvenørn resided in the building from 1808 to 1810.

Ship-owner and politician Lauritz Nicolai Hvidt lived in the building from 1812 until his death in 1856.  He was a member of the Copenhagen City Council from 1840 and its chairman from 1841. As a liberal politician, he was involved in the work for a free constitution. On 20 March 1848, he led a procession of 10,000 people that marched from Copenhagen City Hall on Nytorv to Christiansborg Palace.

The jurist F. T. J. Gram (1816–1871) was a resident in the building from 1848 to 1853. His next home was in Gammel Strand 36.

The politician Anders Sandøe Ørsted lived in the building as Hvidt's tenant from 1851 and remained there until his death in 1861.

The archeologist Jens Jacob Asmussen Worsaae lived in the building from 1853 to 1857.

Cabinet Secretary Jens Peter Trap (1810–1885), publisher of the monumental work Trap Danmark, lived in the building 1857–1871. The influential architect and local politician Ferdinand Meldahl lived in the building from 1858 to 1875.

Journalist and politician C. St. A. Bille (1828–1898) lived in the building from 1875 to 1880. Ferdinand Frederik Ekman (1839–1901) was a resident in the building at the time of his death in 1901. He is one of the businessmen depicted on Peder Severin Krøyer's monumental 1895 group portrait painting From Copenhagen Stock Exchange. He was married to royal opera singer Nanna Maria Andrejette Ekman. Gyldendal director Peter Nansen (1861–1918) lived in the building from 1912 until his death in 1918.

Det Hoffensbergske Etablissement, a printing business was based in the building from at least 1910 to 1950.

Architecture
The building consists of four storeys over a high cellar. It is five bays wide. The roof has three dormers.

References

External links

 1840 resident

Listed residential buildings in Copenhagen
Residential buildings completed in 1806
1806 establishments in Denmark